Halicornopsis is a genus of cnidarians belonging to the family Kirchenpaueriidae.

The species of this genus are found in Africa and Australia.

Species:
 Halicornopsis elegans (Lamarck, 1816)

References

Kirchenpaueriidae
Hydrozoan genera